The Catholic Church in Korea is part of the worldwide Catholic Church, under the spiritual leadership of the pope in Rome.

The Catholic hierarchy in Korea has never been divided between South and North, in the same manner as the Catholic hierarchy in Germany was never divided between East and West between the artificially created borders. For example, some parts of the territory of the archdiocese of Seoul are located in North Korea. Nevertheless, since the political division of Korea in 1945, Catholicism has had a different development in North and South.

North Korea

North Korea is officially an atheist state and does not have diplomatic relations with the Holy See. The Catholic hierarchy has been inactive there for decades (i.e. since the end of the Korean War), and there are no active Catholic churches in the country.

The only territorial abbey outside of Europe and one of only 11 remaining territorial abbeys is the Territorial Abbey of Tokwon, located near Wonsan in North Korea. The persecution of Christians in North Korea since 1949 has made any activity in the abbacy impossible. However, the Territorial Abbacy of Tokwon is formally still kept as one of the few remaining territorial abbeys within the Catholic Church.

South Korea

About 11% of the population of South Korea (roughly 5.8 million) are Catholics, with about 1,734 parishes and 5,360 priests as of 2017. By proportion of a national population and by raw number of adherents, South Korea ranks among the most strongly Catholic countries in Asia after the Philippines and East Timor.

See also
Catholic Bishops' Conference of Korea
Christianity in Korea
Catholic Church in China

References

 
Korea
Korea